Shaheen (Urdu: شاہین) is a historical novel written in Urdu by Pakistani Islamic historian and novelist Naseem Hijazi.

It details the situation of the Muslims in Granada in 1492 when they were about to be expelled from Spain. The novel also very beautifully depicts the reasons of the destruction of Muslim power in Granada.

External links
 Shaheen and other novels by Naseem Hijazi available online
 Shaheen (English Translation) on Wattpad
 Shaheen (English Translation) on Scribd
Urdu-language literature
Pakistani novels
Historical novels
Novels by Naseem Hijazi
Crypto-Islam
History books about Islam
Emirate of Granada
Urdu-language novels